Megachile aterrima is a species of bee in the family Megachilidae. It was described by Smith in 1861.

References

Aterrima
Insects described in 1861